Wabbaseka Methodist Episcopal Church, South is a historic church on United States Route 79 in Wabbaseka, Arkansas.  It is a single story masonry structure with Classical Revival styling, built in 1925 for a congregation established in 1870.  The congregation has since been reunited with the main Methodist organizations, and is now known as the Wabbaseka United Methodist Church. The church is architecturally significant as the only local example of Classical Revival architecture.

The building was listed on the National Register of Historic Places in 2002.

See also
National Register of Historic Places listings in Jefferson County, Arkansas

References

1925 establishments in Arkansas
Churches on the National Register of Historic Places in Arkansas
Churches completed in 1925
Churches in Jefferson County, Arkansas
Methodist churches in Arkansas
National Register of Historic Places in Jefferson County, Arkansas
Neoclassical architecture in Arkansas
Neoclassical church buildings in the United States